Aruba participated in the 2010 Summer Youth Olympics in Singapore.

The Aruba team consisted of 4 athletes competing in 3 sports: judo, sailing and swimming.

Judo

Individual

Team

Sailing

One Person Dinghy

Swimming

References

External links
Competitors List: Aruba

Nations at the 2010 Summer Youth Olympics
2010 in Aruba
Aruba at the Youth Olympics